Abu Shuja Ghiyath al-Dunya wa'l-Din Muhammad ibn Malik-Shah (1082 – 1118), better known as Muhammad I Tapar, was the sultan of the Seljuk Empire from 1105 to 1118. He was a son of Malik-Shah I and Taj al-Din Khatun Safariya. In Turkish, Tapar means "he who obtains, finds".

Reign
Muhammad was born in January 1082. He succeeded his nephew, Malik Shah II, as Seljuq Sultan in Baghdad, and thus was theoretically the head of the dynasty, although his brother Ahmad Sanjar in Khorasan held more practical power. Muhammad I probably allied himself with Radwan of Aleppo in the battle of the Khabur River against Kilij Arslan I, the sultan of Rüm, in 1107, in which the latter was defeated and killed. Following the internecine conflict with his half brother, Barkiyaruq, he was given the title of malik and the provinces of Armenia and Azerbaijan. Dissatisfied by this he revolted again, but had to flee back to Armenia. By 1104, Barkiyaruq, ill and tired of war, agreed to divide the sultanate with Muhammad. Muhammad became sole sultan following the death of Barkiyaruq in 1105.

In 1106, Muhammad conquered the Ismaili fortress of Shahdiz, and ordered the Bavandid ruler Shahriyar IV to participate in his campaign against the Ismailis. Shahriyar, greatly angered by the message Muhammad sent him, refused to aid him against the Ismailis. Shortly after, Muhammad sent an army headed by Amir Chavli, who tried to capture Sari but was unexpectedly defeated by an army under Shahriyar and his son Qarin III. Muhammad then sent a letter, which requested Shahriyar to send one of his sons to the Seljuq court in Isfahan. He sent his son Ali I, who impressed Muhammad so much that he offered him his daughter in marriage, but Ali refused and told him to grant the honor to his brother and heir of the Bavand dynasty, Qarin III. Qarin III then went to the Isfahan court and married her.

In 1106/1107, Ahmad ibn Nizam al-Mulk, the son of the famous vizier Nizam al-Mulk, went to the court of Muhammad I to file a complaint against the rais (head) of Hamadan. When Ahmad arrived to the court, Muhammad I appointed him as his vizier, replacing Sa'd al-Mulk Abu'l-Mahasen Abi, who had been recently executed on suspicion of heresy. The appointment was due mainly to the reputation of Ahmad's father. He was then given various titles which his father held (Qewam al-din, Sadr al-Islam and Nizam al-Mulk).

Muhammad I, along with his vizier Ahmad, later campaigned in Iraq, where they defeated and killed the Mazyadid ruler Sayf al-dawla Sadaqa ibn Mansur, who bore the title "king of the Arabs". In 1109, Muhammad I sent Ahmad and Chavli Saqavu to capture the Ismaili fortresses of Alamut and Ostavand, but they failed to achieve any decisive result and withdrew. Ahmad was shortly replaced by Khatir al-Mulk Abu Mansur Maybudi as vizier of the Sejluq Empire. According to Ali ibn al-Athir (a historian who lived about a hundred years later), Ahmad then retired to a private life in Baghdad, but, according to the contemporary biographer, Anushirvan ibn Khalid, Muhammad I had Ahmad imprisoned for ten years.

Muhammad I died in 1118 and was succeeded by Mahmud II, although after Muhammad I's death Sanjar was clearly the chief power in the Seljuq realms.

Family
One of Muhammad's wives was Gawhar Khatun, the daughter of Isma'il, son of Yaquti. Another wife was Qutlugh Khatun. Another wife was Nistandar Jahan Khatun. She was the mother of Sultan Ghiyath ad-Din Mas'ud and Fatima Khatun. After Muhammad's death Mengubars, the governor of Iraq, married her. Their daughter Fatima married Abbasid Caliph Al-Muqtafi in 1137, and died in September 1147. Another of his daughters married Arslan Shah, son of Kirman Shah, and the grandson of Qavurt.

Legacy and assessment 
Muhammad was the last Seljuk ruler to have strong authority in the western part of the sultanate. The Seljuk realm was in a dire state after Muhammad's death, according to bureaucrat and writer Anushirvan ibn Khalid (died in 1137/1139); "In Muhammad's reign the kingdom was united and secure from all envious attacks; but when it passed to his son Mahmud, they split up that unity and destroyed its cohesion. They claimed a share with him in the power and left him only a bare subsistence." Muhammad is mainly portrayed in a positive light by contemporary historians. According to the historian Imad ad-Din al-Isfahani (died in 1201), Muhammad was "the perfect man of the Seljuk dynasty and their strongest steed".

Muhammad's ceaseless campaigns inspired one of his poets, Iranshah, to compose the Persian epic poem of Bahman-nama, an Iranian mythological story about the constant battles between Kay Bahman and Rostam's family. This implies that the work was also written to serve as advice for solving the socio-political issues of the time.

References

Sources
 

 
 
 
 
 
 
 

Seljuk rulers
1118 deaths
Year of birth unknown
11th-century Turkic people
12th-century Turkic people
People of the Nizari–Seljuk wars